Coming Home in the Dark is a 2021 New Zealand psychological-thriller film based on a 1995 short-story of the same name by Owen Marshall. Directed by James Ashcroft and written by Eli Kent with James Ashcroft, the film stars Daniel Gillies, Erik Thomson, Miriama McDowell and Matthias Luafutu. The film premiered at the 2021 Sundance Film Festival on January 31, 2021.

Plot
A school teacher, Alan 'Hoaggie' Hoaganraad, is on a road trip with his wife Jill and their two teenage sons, Maika and Jordan. While hiking, Maika notices two men in the distance watching them before disappearing. While the family picnics by the road, they are interrupted by the two violent drifters, Mandrake and Tubs. The pair robs them at gunpoint and forces them to lie down, but before they leave, Mandrake overhears Maika call Alan 'Hoaggie'. Mandrake suddenly murders Maika and Jordan and abducts the parents after night falls, breaking Alan's arm and knocking Jill unconscious.

As Mandrake questions the pair, he reveals that he knows Alan is a teacher and was once an assistant teacher at a group home for troubled boys, one notorious for physical and sexual abuse. Alan guesses correctly that both were enrolled at the school, but he insists that he was completely unaware of the abuse; Mandrake does not believe him and implies that they are driving to the boy's home. When they stop at a gas station, Alan attempts to secretly alert the station attendant, however Mandrake suspects this and kills the attendant by bludgeoning him with a fire extinguisher. Alan pretends to accidentally hit himself with the door while entering the car but as he kneels next to the car to "recover" he presses a screw into the back left tire.

Jill attempts to escape, but is quickly caught and later forced to kneel underneath an overpass. Threatening to shoot her, Mandrake forces Alan to admit that he was aware of all of the abuse, but stopped and reported nothing out of cowardice. Alan relays a story of a young boy who tattooed a swastika on his arm; at roll call, an admin painfully and forcibly scrubbed it from his skin with a nylon brush, which traumatized the rest of the students. Jill is shaken by this admittance, and later rebuffs Alan's attempts at contact. When it's clear that Mandrake will not let her go, she escapes from the moving vehicle and then chooses to jump into the nearby river rather than return to her abductors; her fate is left ambiguous.

Alan briefly escapes when they stop to replace the tire Alan pressed a nail into, and reaches a car with a group of teenagers, however Mandrake finds them and convinces them to force Alan out of the car, before murdering them all but one, who manages to escape. With Alan recaptured, they finally reach an old boarding school, presumably where Mandrake and/or Tubs grew up. 

Walking through the now-abandoned building, Alan admits that he was not just a coward, but also privately believed that the boy with the tattoo deserved his punishment. Believing Mandrake to be that boy, he apologizes for not stepping in. Mandrake reveals that the boy wasn't him. He then shoots Alan in the chest and taunts him, but Alan hits him with a rock and bludgeons him. Mandrake survives, though wounded and disoriented, and tries but fails to kill Alan. Tubs, who Alan had talked to a few times implying that he only does what Mandrake tells him to, likening that behaviour to still being in a boarding school, arrives and kills Mandrake with the rifle. He leaves the heavily wounded Alan, telling him "I hate this place", which is also carved into a stone behind Alan. Flashbacks had revealed that that carving was made by a traumatised boy growing up at that boarding school; whether or not that boy had actually been the tortured one is not explicitly shown. Tubs goes to an undisclosed location and looks out at the rising sun, silently crying.

Cast
The cast includes:
 Daniel Gillies as Mandrake
 Erik Thomson as Hoaggie
 Miriama McDowell as Jill
 Matthias Luafutu as Tubs

Release
Coming Home in the Dark premiered at the 2021 Sundance Film Festival on January 31, 2021 in the Midnight section.

Reception
Review aggregator Rotten Tomatoes gave the film a 92% approval rating from 62 reviews and an average rating of 7.0/10. The critical consensus reads: "Smart, well-acted, and above all scary, Coming Home in the Dark finds first-time director James Ashcroft making his mark with a white-knuckle ride for horror fans."

References

External links
 
 

2021 films
2020s New Zealand films
Films about educators
New Zealand thriller films
2021 thriller films
2020s English-language films